UCM Multipurpose Building is a 6,500 seat multi-purpose arena in Warrensburg, Missouri, United States, on the campus of the University of Central Missouri.  It was built in 1976, and is the home of the Central Missouri Mules and Jennies men's and women's basketball, women's volleyball, and indoor track teams. With a listed seating capacity of 6,500 seats, it one of the largest arenas by seating capacity in the Mid-America Intercollegiate Athletics Association.

External links
 Multipurpose Building

Indoor arenas in Missouri
College basketball venues in the United States
Sports venues in Missouri
Buildings and structures in Johnson County, Missouri